Asaduzzaman Payel (born 1 September 1998) is a Bangladeshi cricketer. He made his Twenty20 debut for Uttara Sporting Club in the 2018–19 Dhaka Premier Division Twenty20 Cricket League on 27 February 2019. He made his List A debut for Uttara Sporting Club in the 2018–19 Dhaka Premier Division Cricket League on 8 March 2019. He made his first-class debut for Rajshahi Division in the 2020–21 National Cricket League on 22 March 2021.

References

External links
 

1998 births
Living people
Bangladeshi cricketers
Rajshahi Division cricketers
Uttara Sporting Club cricketers
Place of birth missing (living people)